Corros is one of six parishes (administrative divisions)  in Avilés, a municipality within the province and autonomous community of Asturias, in northern Spain. 

They may be found within the area of Caldoveiro Peak.

Villages

Scenic areas
 Caldoveiro Peak : A mountain range well known for its corros.

Parishes in Avilés